Casino is the third album by jazz guitarist Al Di Meola. It was released in 1978.

Track listing
All songs written by Al Di Meola, except where noted.

Side One
"Egyptian Danza" – 5:56
"Chasin' the Voodoo" (Mingo Lewis) – 5:05
"Dark Eye Tango" – 5:23

Side Two
"Señor Mouse" (Chick Corea) – 7:21
"Fantasia Suite for Two Guitars" – 5:11
"Viva La Danzarina"
"Guitars of the Exotic Isle"
"Rhapsody Italia"
"Bravoto Fantasia"
"Casino" – 9:29

Charts

Personnel 
 Al Di Meola – guitars, mandolin, percussion, hand claps
 Barry Miles – keyboards, percussion
 Anthony Jackson – bass guitar
 Steve Gadd – drums
 Eddie Colon – percussion
 Mingo Lewis – percussion

References

1978 albums
Al Di Meola albums
Columbia Records albums